This is a list of the National Register of Historic Places listings in Cerro Gordo County, Iowa.

This is intended to be a complete list of the properties and districts on the National Register of Historic Places in Cerro Gordo County, Iowa, United States. Latitude and longitude coordinates are provided for many National Register properties and districts; these locations may be seen together in a map.

There are 47 properties and districts listed on the National Register in the county, one of which is a National Historic Landmark.

|}

See also

 List of National Historic Landmarks in Iowa
 National Register of Historic Places listings in Iowa
 Listings in neighboring counties: Floyd, Franklin, Hancock, Mitchell, Worth

References

Cerro Gordo
 
Buildings and structures in Cerro Gordo County, Iowa